Kolkata Poetry Confluence is an international multilingual literary fest bringing together poets, translators, poetry publishers and poetry lovers at Kolkata. The event is organised by Antonym Magazine and Bhasha Samsad also includes a poetry book fair.

Organisers
The main organisers of the Confluence are Antonym Magazine and Bhasha Samsad publishers.

Participants
The Confluence is attended by poets and translators in different languages from all over the world. Participants also included leading film and media persons like Sudeshna Roy, Anindya Chatterjee, Abhijit Guha, and Srijato.

The 2022 Event
The Kolkata Poetry Confluence 2022 was organised from June 11-13, 2022 on the theme of "inclusivity". Professor Chaiti Mitra was Director of the Confluence. :-

Award winners
Kolkata Poetry Confluence gave away Jibanananda Das Award and Sonali Ghoshal Award for outstanding works of poetry translation from Indian languages into English. The following are the Jibanananda Das award winners :-

 Assamese :- Harshita Hiya for translating Sameer Tanti
 Bengali :- Indrani Bhattacharya for translating Mohammad Nurul Huda
 Hindi :- Pallavi Singh for translating Anamika
 Kashmiri :- Mohammad Zahid for Naseem Shafaie
 Marathi :- Santosh Rathod for translating Santosh Pawar
 Odia :- Snehaprava Das for translating Saroj Bal
 Tamil :- Deepalakshmi Joseph for translating Sukirtharani
 Urdu :- Tapan Kumar Pradhan for translating Munawwar Rana

References

Poetry
Indian poetry
Indian literature websites
Indian literary awards
Literary awards by language
Translation awards